Heinz Höher (11 August 1938 – 7 November 2019) was a German football player and manager.

Playing career
Höher played for Bayer Leverkusen, Meidericher SV, FC Twente and VfL Bochum.

Coaching career
Höher coached Schwarz-Weiß Essen, VfL Bochum, MSV Duisburg, Fortuna Düsseldorf, Ethnikos Piraeus F.C., PAOK, Olympiacos and 1. FC Nürnberg.

Career statistics

References

External links 
 

1938 births
2019 deaths
German footballers
Association football midfielders
Association football forwards
Bundesliga players
Eredivisie players
Bayer 04 Leverkusen players
MSV Duisburg players
FC Twente players
VfL Bochum players
German football managers
Bundesliga managers
Schwarz-Weiß Essen managers
VfL Bochum managers
MSV Duisburg managers
Fortuna Düsseldorf managers
Ethnikos Piraeus F.C. managers
PAOK FC managers
Olympiacos F.C. managers
1. FC Nürnberg managers
German expatriate footballers
German expatriate sportspeople in the Netherlands
Expatriate footballers in the Netherlands
German expatriate sportspeople in Greece
Expatriate football managers in Greece
German expatriate sportspeople in Saudi Arabia
Expatriate football managers in Saudi Arabia
Sportspeople from Leverkusen
Footballers from North Rhine-Westphalia